Pokrovske is a village (a selo) in the Mariupol Raion (district) of Donetsk Oblast in eastern Ukraine.

History
Pokrovske was known as Samaryna Balka until 1945 and from 1945 to 2016 as Illichivske. It was given its current name in 2016 as part of decommunization in Ukraine.

Until 18 July 2020, Pokrovske belonged to Manhush Raion. The raion was abolished that day as part of the administrative reform of Ukraine, which reduced the number of raions of Donetsk Oblast to eight, of which only five were controlled by the government. The Manhush Raion was merged into Mariupol Raion.

Demographics
Native language as of the Ukrainian Census of 2001:
 Ukrainian 26.97%
 Russian 72.74%
 Belarusian 0.07%

References

Villages in Mariupol Raion